Master Paul of Levoča (German: Paul von Leutschau,) was a medieval carver and sculptor of the 15th and 16th century, active mostly in then Carpathian-German town of Levoča, Slovakia.

History
Most documents about him seem to have perished in the Levoča fire of 1550. Thus neither his surname, nor dates or places of birth and death, are known. It is assumed that he was born between 1470 and 1480. He must have died between 1537 (when he is still mentioned on record) and 1542 (when his widow is mentioned).

His origin is unknown. Theories of his origin include being a native of Levoča, theories of German origin link him to Passau, Wittenberg and Augsburg. He was also linked with origins from northern Italy or Tyrol. He probably started working in Kraków, judged by the connections of this city with Levoča at that time and, based on the artistic similarities, he may have been a student of Veit Stoss. He worked in Sabinov and Banská Bystrica before settling in Levoča in 1500, marrying a daughter of an influential citizen. In 1506 he established a carving workshop. A list of some of his works includes an Altar of St. Barbara in Banská Bystrica dated to 1509, an Altar of St. George in Spišská Sobota of 1516, and his most famous work, completed in 1517, an altar in the Basilica of St. James in Levoča. This late Gothic altar is the tallest in Europe, measured at 18.62 meters. It is carved in wood and decorated with gold. The Madonna from this altar was depicted in the former issue of 100 SKK banknotes (before Slovakia's adoption of the Euro in 2009).

In 1527 he became a member of the Levoča town council, but he gained most of his fame and recognition after his death. He began to be recognised by art historians in 1870s in debates concerning the Levoča altar.

References 

 Hleb, E.: Levoča in history. Prešov 1995.
 CHALUPECKÝ, I.: St. James' Church. Martin 1991.
 CHALUPECKÝ, I.: Contribution to the biography of Master Paul. In: Writings - homeland Proceedings I. Ves, 1967, pp. 181–187
 Kluber, Š.: Master Paul in Szepes towns. In: Levoča - provincial seat of Szepes (1271-1971). Levoča 1971 pp. 23–25
 Master Paul of Levoča - life, work time. Proceedings of seminar. Levoča 1991.

External links

 Spectacular Slovakia
 St. Jacob’s Church in the town of Levoča
 Panorama.sk

Gothic sculptors
Hungarian sculptors
15th-century Hungarian people
16th-century Hungarian people
People from Levoča